Weighed But Found Wanting (Filipino: Tinimbang Ka Ngunit Kulang; also known as Human Imperfections
) is a 1974 Filipino drama film directed by Lino Brocka. The films stars Christopher De Leon (in his debut role), Hilda Koronel, Lolita Rodriguez and Eddie Garcia. Considered one of Brocka's most important films, it won six awards (including Best Picture) at the 23rd FAMAS Awards in 1975.

Plot 
The story begins with a flashback to the past of a woman called Kuala (Lolita Rodríguez). An herbolario (traditional/folk medicine practitioner) performs an abortion on Kuala, as César (Eddie García) watches her. The abortion was a success, but when Kuala sees the aborted foetus, she becomes very disturbed. In the next scene, she walks in the middle of a grassy plain, and as the heat becomes more and more unbearable, she becomes insane.

In the present, Kuala, now the village idiot, wanders about her Nueva Ecija town in dirty clothes and with mangy hair. The townsfolk mock and deride Kuala, and she is pushed into a watering hole where she almost drowns.

Bertong Ketong (Mario O'Hara), a leper yearning for female companionship, attracts Kuala with a rattle and takes her to his shack in the cemetery. Junior (Christopher de León) makes friends with them, defying the prohibitions of his father, César Blanco, who is a lawyer and failed politician.

Junior asks Berto's advice concerning his problems with his eccentric teacher, Mr. Del Mundo (Orlando Nadres), who has a crush on him, and with his girlfriend, Evangeline (Hilda Koronel), who flirted with her escort during that year's Santacruzan. The jealous Junior left the procession and sought the company of Milagros (Laurice Guillen), who seduces him.

The local Asociación de las Damas Cristianas (Association of Christian Ladies) is later scandalised to discover that Kuala has fallen pregnant. She is forced to live in the custody of the pious Lola Jacoba (Rosa Aguirre). When Berto makes a clandestine visit to Kuala, she tells him of his unhappiness. Berto tells this to Junior, who resolves to help the pregnant Kuala make an escape from Lola Jacoba's house and lead her back to Berto's shack. However, Berto knows she will be taken away and returns her to Lola Jacoba, and promises to retrieve her after she has given birth.

Some nights later, Kuala experiences labour pains. She finds her way to Berto's shack, at which point Berto rushes out to fetch a doctor. When the doctor refuses to help him, Berto takes him hostage but repeats he will not kill him. As Berto flees with the doctor, the doctor's wife shouts for help, awakening the townspeople who rush to follow the fleeing pair. Before Berto and the doctor reach the shack, however, the doctor escapes and a chase ensues. A group of policemen come to the doctor's rescue and shoot Berto. Junior sees this and is shocked; he holds Berto's dead body and weeps in the midst of the crowd.

Junior then enters the shack where Kuala has birthed a boy, but lies weakened by the labour. She becomes lucid, and in her sanity she recognises Junior and realizes that Berto has been killed. She also recognises César amongst the crowd, and asks him why he killed their child, revealing his secret. Kuala then gives her baby boy to Junior, and dies. As Junior leaves the shack, he stares hard at the townspeople, including his parents, Evangeline, and all who were unkind to him, Berto, and Kuala. He walks near Berto's corpse and pauses, as the people look on in silence. Junior then leaves the cemetery, carrying Berto and Kuala's son.

Cast 
Christopher de Leon as "Junior" Blanco
Mario O'Hara as Bertong Ketong
Lolita Rodriguez as Kuala
Eddie Garcia as Cesar Blanco
Lilia Dizon as Carolina Blanco
Hilda Koronel as Evangeline Ortega
Laurice Guillen as Milagros
Orlando Nadres as Mr. Del Mundo
Leah Sulongsawa as Lucy

Production

Villa Epifania 
The movie was partly filmed in "The Grand Old House of Sta. Rita" (also the film site of Tanging Yaman and many other films).

Background 
Tinimbang, considered by Lino Brocka as his "first novel" and his first production for his own film outfit, is the story of a young boy growing up in a small town and the unusual friendship he develops with a leper and the village idiot. Their stories draw forth the true nature of hypocrisy in the small town and the boy bears witness and participates in the various emotions that throb under the seemingly quiet village life - prejudice, cruelty, forgiveness, and even love. In Tinimbang, Brocka clearly shows man's limitations as a mortal being, but sends a message of hope for the movie, and in the end, speaks ultimately of rebirth and maturity.

Release

Box office

Critical reception

Accolades 
The film won six FAMAS Awards out of eight nominations:
Best Picture
Best Actor (Christopher de Leon)
Best Actress (Lolita Rodriguez)
Best Director (Lino Brocka)
Best Musical Score (Lutgardo Labad)
Best Theme Song (Emmanuel Lacaba for Awit ni Kuala)
It was also nominated for Best Supporting Actor (Mario O'Hara) and Best Supporting Actress (Laurice Guillen).

References

External links 

1974 films
1974 drama films
Philippine drama films
Tagalog-language films
Films about abortion
Films directed by Lino Brocka